Hariharpur may refer to:

Hariharpur, India
Hariharpur, Dhanbad, village in Jharkhand, India
Hariharpur, Baruipur, census town in West Bengal, India
Hariharpur, Nepal (disambiguation), several places in Nepal